Christian Poswiat (born 26 June 1968) is a German swimmer who won two bronze medals in medley relays at the 1987 European Aquatics Championships and 1991 World Aquatics Championships. He also competed at the 1988 and 1992 Summer Olympics in the 100 m and 200 breaststroke; his best achievement was eighth place in the 100 m event in 1988.

After retirement, he continued competing in the masters category, and won several gold medals in medley and freestyle relays at the World Cups of 2010 and 2012. He works a swimming teacher for babies in Wuppertal. His sister Cordula was also a competitive swimmer in East Germany.

References

1968 births
German male swimmers
Swimmers at the 1988 Summer Olympics
Swimmers at the 1992 Summer Olympics
German male breaststroke swimmers
Olympic swimmers of East Germany
Olympic swimmers of Germany
Living people
World Aquatics Championships medalists in swimming
European Aquatics Championships medalists in swimming
Swimmers from Berlin
20th-century German people
21st-century German people